Cogdell is an unincorporated community and census-designated place (CDP) in the northeast corner of Clinch County, Georgia, United States.

Cogdell was first listed as a CDP prior to the 2020 census with a population of 23.

Demographics

2020 census

Note: the US Census treats Hispanic/Latino as an ethnic category. This table excludes Latinos from the racial categories and assigns them to a separate category. Hispanics/Latinos can be of any race.

Notable people
 Russ Goodman, politician

References 

Census-designated places in Clinch County, Georgia